The Dominican Summer League Cardinals  or DSL Cardinals are a rookie league affiliate of the St. Louis Cardinals based in the Dominican Republic.  The team plays in the Boca Chica South division of the Dominican Summer League.

History
The team first came into existence in 1989 as a shared affiliate of the Pittsburgh Pirates and the New York Mets.  In 1990, they shared an affiliation with the Houston Astros.  From 1991 to 1993, they shared an affiliation with the Detroit Tigers and from 1994 to 1995, they shared an affiliation with the Philadelphia Phillies.  The team became an independent Cardinals affiliate in 1996 and has remained so ever since, with the exception of the 2004 season during which team operations were suspended.

Roster

References

External links

Dominican Summer League teams
Baseball teams in the Dominican Republic
St. Louis Cardinals minor league affiliates